Clepsis lindebergi is a moth of the family Tortricidae. It is found in a narrow area ranging from Finland, south through Poland, Slovakia and Austria to Italy.

It is endangered because of habitat loss. It is found on seminatural dry grasslands.

The wingspan is 18–20 mm. Adults are on wing from June to July.

References

External links
 Fauna Europaea

Clepsis
Moths described in 1952
Moths of Europe